Rachael Elizabeth Rapinoe (born July 5, 1985) is an American former soccer player who played as a midfielder and forward. She played for Stjarnan Women in Iceland and the United States women's national under-23 soccer team.

Early life
Rapinoe grew up in Redding, California, with her parents, Jim and Denise, and five siblings, including her fraternal twin sister, Megan Rapinoe, who also became a professional soccer player. She has Italian (from her paternal grandfather) and Irish ancestry. She attended Foothill High School, where she played both basketball and track, but did not play soccer initially. She and her sister later played for club soccer team Elk Grove United, ranked number one nationally in 2003 and which finished second at the 2003 U-19 National Championships.

University of Portland
Rapinoe attended the University of Portland, majoring in life science. She became the Portland Pilots go-to scorer in 2006 after a midseason switch from defender to forward after her sister Megan experienced an ACL injury.  She scored nine goals and seven assists, including five goals in four playoff games.

In 2007, she was named West Coast Conference Co-Player of the Week.

Rapinoe experienced a torn knee ligament injury in 2007, re-torn in 2008, which was said to be a career-ender; she did play after that date, until the ligament tore again in 2012.

She later announced that she had retired from soccer and was interested in pursuing a career in medicine. In 2016, she received a Master's degree in Health Studies in Exercise from Portland State.

Playing career

Club

Stjarnan Women
In July 2010, Rapinoe re-emerged on the international soccer scene when it was announced that she had signed with Icelandic professional women's team, Stjarnan Women. She made five appearances for the team and scored two goals.

International
In 2006, Rapinoe played for the United States women's national under-23 soccer team.

Coaching career
In 2011, Rachael Rapinoe was chosen to represent the United States by the International Center's Sports Corps program in the Indonesia America Soccer Exchange where she helped conduct three one-day training clinics for an estimated 200–300 female athletes and 30 coaches.

She has hosted youth soccer camps with her sister Megan Rapinoe.

References

External links
 
 Portland Pilots player profile
 
 US Soccer player profile

1985 births
American women's soccer players
Living people
People from Redding, California
Portland Pilots women's soccer players
Soccer players from California
American twins
Women's association football midfielders
Women's association football forwards
Twin sportspeople
Stjarnan women's football players